Charles Stevenson (October 15, 1919 – August 21, 1995) was an American racecar driver.

AAA and USAC Championship Car series
Stevenson drove in the AAA and USAC Championship Car series, racing in the 1949–1954, 1960–1961, and 1963–1965 seasons with 54 starts, including the Indianapolis 500 races in 1951–1954, 1960–1961, and 1963–1965. He finished in the top ten 37 times, with four victories, two of them coming in the 1952 season when he won the AAA National Championship.

Panamericana race 
In 1951 Stevenson drove a Nash-Healey course (pace) car that was supplied by the Mexican Nash automobile importer in the grueling  Carrera Panamericana race. This endurance event is described as one of the most dangerous automobile races of any type in the world, and Stevenson had to be ahead of the racers to ensure the way was clear. In both 1952 and 1953 Stevenson won the sedan class driving a "well-prepared" Lincoln Capri. He is the only two-time winner in the history of the Carrera Panamericana.

NASCAR 
Stevenson also raced in two NASCAR events: one in 1955 and one in 1956, picking up a win at Willow Springs Raceway in 1956 driving a Ford. In the 1955 race, he was driving a car owned by Indy winner Pete DePaolo.

Complete AAA/USAC Championship Car results

Indy 500 results

World Championship career summary
The Indianapolis 500 was part of the FIA World Championship from 1950 through 1960. Drivers competing at Indy during those years were credited with World Championship points and participation. Chuck Stevenson participated in five World Championship races but scored no World Championship points.

References 

1919 births
1995 deaths
Champ Car champions
Indianapolis 500 drivers
NASCAR drivers
People from Sidney, Montana
Racing drivers from Montana
AAA Championship Car drivers
World Sportscar Championship drivers
People from Benson, Arizona
Carrera Panamericana drivers